Euglossa viridissima  is a species of euglossine bee native to Central America.

References

viridissima
Insects described in 1899
Orchid pollinators